McGaugh is a surname. Notable people with the surname include:

James McGaugh (born 1931), American neuroscientist
Joe Don McGaugh (born 1983), American politician
Stacy McGaugh (born 1964), American astronomer